Elin Gustavsdotter Sture  (15th century  – 1495)  was a Swedish noblewoman, consort of the regent Erik Axelsson (Tott).

Biography
Elin Gustavsdotter was the daughter of the nobleman Gustav Algotsson of the influential Sture family. She was married to Erik Axelsson  Tott in September 1466 in a marriage alliance arranged to strengthen Axelsson's position and support within the Swedish nobility; the same year, he was elected Regent by the Swedish nobility. Lady Elin thereby became first lady and took the part of a queen within the Swedish court. In 1467 her spouse resigned his position as Regent in favour of King Charles VIII and became governor of the eastern border provinces in Finland. The couple had no known children.

References

Other sources
Litet lexikon över Sveriges regenter" av Lars O. Lagerqvist och Nils Åberg

15th-century births
1495 deaths
Spouses of national leaders
15th-century Swedish nobility
15th-century Swedish women